Warped Tour 1996 was the 2nd edition of the Vans Warped Tour, and the first Warped Tour to be sponsored by Vans. The 24-date tour began on July 4, 1996 in Phoenix, Arizona and ended August 8, 1996 in Panama City, Florida.

The tour featured a main stage and a second stage, on which bands alternated so that as one band finished playing, the band on the other stage would begin. The band lineups and running orders on the two stages differed between dates. Some shows also featured a third stage with additional bands. All shows were held in outdoor venues with the exception of the show in Washington DC and Milwaukee, WI. The show was originally scheduled for Merriweather Post Pavilion in Columbia, MD but due to issues with the venue, the show was moved at the last minute to the much smaller  The Capitol Ballroom nightclub. It  The tour headliners included Fishbone, The Mighty Mighty Bosstones, NOFX, Pennywise, and Rocket from the Crypt.

This was the first Warped Tour for The Mighty Mighty Bosstones, NOFX, Pennywise, and Blink-182, all of which played on multiple future Warped Tours. According to tour founder Kevin Lyman, the addition of punk bands such as NOFX and Pennywise helped establish the tour as a "credible" punk festival, thus making it more successful than the first year's eclectic lineup. A 2011 Warped Tour retrospective article in the Dallas Observer deemed the 1996 lineup one of the four best ever Warped Tour lineups in its 17-year history up to that point.

Vans sponsorship

Lyman sought a sponsor after promoters refused to pay for the tour in its second year because the first edition of the tour the year before had not made money. After a planned meeting with Calvin Klein was delayed by a blizzard, he received a call from Vans who wanted to launch an amateur skateboarding contest at the festival. Lyman, who was "desperate for money to keep the tour going", convinced them to sponsor the tour for $300,000. Vans later gave Lyman an additional $100,000 to buy back merchandising rights to the tour that he had already sold to another company. With the sponsorship, Lyman said that the tour "just survived the second year" and "paid everyone back from the first year."

Bands
 311
 The Alkaholiks
 Beck
 Blink 182
 CIV
 Dance Hall Crashers
 Deftones
 Dick Dale
 Down By Law
 Face To Face
 The Figgs
 Fishbone
 Fluf
 Goldfinger
 The Mighty Mighty Bosstones
 NOFX
 Mushroomhead
 Pennywise
 Reel Big Fish
 Rocket From the Crypt
 Sense Field
 Unwritten Law
 Lagwagon
 White Kaps
 The Meices

Tour dates

References

1996 concert tours
Warped Tours